Donisthorpe Woodland Park is located on Church Street, Donisthorpe in North West Leicestershire.

Description 
A 36-hectare former colliery site (Donisthorpe Colliery operating between 1871 and 1990) in The National Forest. There are links to the  Ashby Woulds Heritage Trail and Moira Furnace along the towpath of the restored Ashby Canal.

Leicestershire County Council acquired the site in 1995 and began reclamation. The easily accessible pathways are suitable to walk (popular with dog walkers), cycle or ride horses.

Features & activities
Free car parking. Benches and picnic tables, a network of paths and permissive horse tracks. The Conkers Park Run makes use of the Park every Saturday starting at 09:00 am at Conkers using the Ashby Woulds Heritage Trail with a loop along the canal side before returning via the trail to Conkers.

Gallery

External links
Internet Archive - Leicestershire CC - Park Page
The National Forest
Leicestershire CC - Donisthorpe Woodland Park
Ashby Woulds Trail
Conkers Park Run

Mining and the environment
Parks and open spaces in Leicestershire